Willke is a surname. Notable people with the surname include:

Helmut Willke (born 1945), German sociologist
John C. Willke (1925–2015), American physician, author, and anti-abortion activist

See also
Wilkie (disambiguation)
Willkie
Willikies

Surnames from given names